The Parker Homestead is a historic home and grounds in Little Silver, Monmouth County, New Jersey, United States, located at 235  Rumson Road near Sickles Park. The main house was originally built circa 1720, and includes materials from an earlier structure (c. 1667) the early and late 19th century, and the 1910s and 1920s. It is one of the oldest extant buildings in the state. The farmstead which also includes three outlying barns were listed on the New Jersey Register of Historic Places and the National Register of Historic Places. in 2011.

Original settlers
Little Silver was settled by two of the original patentees of Shrewsbury Township, one of the earliest English-speaking settlements in New Jersey Brothers Joseph and Peter Parker  settled in the area in 1667 and owned land bounded by Parker's Creek on the south and Little Silver Creek on the north, named their holdings "Little Silver" after their father's (George Parker) estate in Portsmouth, Rhode Island. The farm remained in the family until the last descendant of the original settlers,  Julia Parker, died in 1995.

Acquisition and preservation
After  Julia Parker died the homestead was acquired by the borough, through her bequest, with the condition that it be preserved. Studies are being conducted as to how to proceed with restoration of the property. The Garden State Historic Preservation Trust Fund awarded a $44,625 grant for the site and local authorities used that money for preliminary preparations and consultant fees to outline a plan for future work and use of the historic property. The condition of the buildings are considered precarious and immediate stabilization is considered a priority.

In the summer of 2013, an Eagle Scout project was conducted to clear invasive and obtrusive plants from the area surrounding the pond next to the house.

See also
List of the oldest buildings in New Jersey
Monmouth County Historical Association

References 

Houses on the National Register of Historic Places in New Jersey
Houses in Monmouth County, New Jersey
Houses completed in 1667
National Register of Historic Places in Monmouth County, New Jersey
New Jersey Register of Historic Places
1667 establishments in New Jersey
Little Silver, New Jersey